Matthew Byrne (born 5 June 1992) is an Australian soccer midfielder last playing with Eastern Suburbs FC.

Career
Born in Brisbane, he played with Mt Gravatt Hawks FC, Capalaba, Brisbane Force and Brisbane Roar youth teams In 2011 Byrne joined Rochdale Rovers and played with them in the 2011 Brisbane Premier League

In January 2012 he came to Serbia for trials and signed with FK Donji Srem.  At the end of the season Donji Srem got promotion to the 2012–13 Serbian SuperLiga.  Byrne played the first half of the season in the Serbian top tier having played 5 matches, and during the winter break he was loaned to FK Partizan farm club, FK Teleoptik, playing back in the second tier.

In summer 2013 he returned to Australia and joined Olympic FC. Having arrived from Serbia where he regularly played as right-back, during 2014, he made a big impression in the Olympic FC team as a central defender. His performances in the PlayStation 4 NPL Queensland have earned him a nomination for the Supporters’ Team of the Year, and, subsequently, Byrne was offered a new contract for the 2015 season, which he signed. In October 2014, Byrne received the Olympic FC's Senior Awards dinner at The Greek Club the award of the most consistent senior team player.

References

External links
 

1992 births
Sportsmen from Queensland
Association football midfielders
Australian expatriate soccer players
Soccer players from Brisbane
FK Donji Srem players
FK Teleoptik players
Serbian First League players
Serbian SuperLiga players
Expatriate footballers in Serbia
National Premier Leagues players
Living people
Australian soccer players